PFT may refer to:

Medical and fitness
 Physical Fitness Test, a test of an individual's physical fitness such as ability to exercise, etc.
 Pulmonary Function Testing, testing of the respiratory system
 Pore-forming toxins, a class of proteins

Other
 Patrimoine Ferroviaire et Tourisme, a Belgian railway preservation society
 Paul F. Tompkins, contemporary American comedian and podcaster
 Pearce-Ford Tower, the largest residence hall in the state of Kentucky at Western Kentucky University
 Plant Functional Type, a classification of plants for use in climatology
 Polish Fighting Team, or "Skalski's Circus", a group of World War II Polish fighter pilots
 Print for time, a business arrangement between a photographer and a model
 Profootballtalk.com, a news and rumor website that focuses on the National Football League in the United States